Anna Lindström (born 19 March 1982) is a Finnish former racing cyclist. She finished in third place in the Finnish National Road Race Championships in 2010.

References

External links
 

1982 births
Living people
Finnish female cyclists
Place of birth missing (living people)